Pearls are a valuable gemstone and come in a number of sizes. This is a list of the biggest pearls.

Context
A pearl is a hard, glistening object produced within the soft tissue (specifically the mantle) of a living shelled mollusk or another animal, such as a conulariid. Just like the shell of a mollusk, a pearl is composed of calcium carbonate (mainly aragonite or a mixture of aragonite and calcite) in minute crystalline form, which has been deposited in concentric layers. The ideal pearl is perfectly round and smooth, but many other shapes, known as baroque pearl can occur. 

The finest quality of natural pearls have been highly valued as gemstones and objects of beauty for many centuries. Because of this, pearl has become a metaphor for something rare, fine, admirable and valuable. The most valuable pearls occur spontaneously in the wild, but are extremely rare. These wild pearls are referred to as natural pearls. Cultured or farmed pearls from pearl oysters and freshwater mussels make up the majority of those currently sold. Whether wild or cultured, gem-quality pearls are almost always nacreous and iridescent, like the interior of the shell that produces them. However, almost all species of shelled mollusks are capable of producing pearls (technically "calcareous concretions") of lesser shine or less spherical shape.

There is a lot of myth and legend surrounding some of these pearls. The Pearl of Lao Tzu for a long time thought to be the largest pearl, but claims about its size and much of its history were found to be fabricated by a conman by the name of Victor Barbish.

List

See also
List of gold nuggets by size
Servilia's pearl

Notes

References

Citations

Bibliography

 

 

 - Total pages: 160 
 

 

 - Total pages: 198  
 
   

Pearls
Gemstone-related lists
Pearls